Kenny Ray Carter (born February 13, 1959) is an American business owner, education activist and former high school basketball coach.

Biography
Coming from a supportive family, Carter was raised strictly on academics, but found a liking in sports. Carter attended college at San Francisco State, then Contra Costa College, and finally George Fox University, where he played basketball.  As a basketball coach, he maintained that his athletes must take their studies seriously, as good academic performance would give them access to college and other opportunities in life.

This belief was put to the test when, as a high school basketball coach at Richmond High School, he locked out his undefeated team for not honoring academic and behavioral contracts. While the community was outraged at first, public opinion eventually changed, and Carter was praised for his determined emphasis on prioritizing good values for his team. His approach also bore results: every one of his players at Richmond, where he coached from 1997 to 2002, graduated. The story of the 1999 season is the basis for the 2005 film Coach Carter, with Carter played by Samuel L. Jackson.

Carter continues to coach sports teams, except basketball. He coached the Slamball team Rumble. He led Rumble to their first Slamball Cup victory in 2001/2002. Carter has said that the greatest moment in his life was when he carried the Olympic Torch for the 2002 Winter Olympics.

Carter has a son named Damien - who played for his father at Richmond, and was portrayed by Robert Ri'chard in the movie - and currently resides in San Antonio, Texas.

In the fall of 2005, Carter proposed opening a boarding school called the Coach Carter Impact Academy in the town of Marlin, Texas. The school opened in 2009. Allowing around 65 students to board and study at the school, the academy is open to around 150 students in grades 8-12. The school is known for placing academic achievement as highly as basketball success for Carter's teams. Striving to build self discipline, the school offers long academic days lasting from 6 am through 6 pm. They require the students to complete their own general tasks, such as laundry and cooking meals. Students also operate a store and barber shop within the grounds of the school.

Slamball coaching record

See also
Coach Carter
Inspirational/motivational instructors/mentors portrayed in films

References

External links
 

Living people
Basketball coaches from Mississippi
High school basketball coaches in California
People from Richmond, California
George Fox University alumni
Slamball
Education activists
1959 births
People from Pike County, Mississippi
Richmond High School (Richmond, California) alumni